The women's team cross-country competition at the 2018 Asian Games in Puncak, Bogor Regency, Indonesia was held from 25 August to 29 August at the Gunung Mas.

Schedule 
All times are Western Indonesia Time (UTC+07:00)

Results

References

External links 
Rowing at the 2018 Asian Games

Paragliding at the 2018 Asian Games